Nilushan Nonis (born 3 September 1987) is a Sri Lankan cricketer. He made his List A debut for Ragama Cricket Club in the 2007–08 Premier Limited Overs Tournament on 9 December 2007. He made his first-class debut for Ragama Cricket Club in the 2007–08 Premier Trophy on 17 January 2008.

References

External links
 

1987 births
Living people
Sri Lankan cricketers
Badureliya Sports Club cricketers
Bloomfield Cricket and Athletic Club cricketers
Kalutara Town Club cricketers
Ragama Cricket Club cricketers
Cricketers from Colombo